Manuel García Carranza (December 28, 1905 – April 13, 1995), nicknamed "Cocaína", was a Cuban professional baseball pitcher in the American Negro leagues in the 1920s and 1930s.

A native of Manacas, Cuba, García made his Negro leagues debut in 1927 for the Cuban Stars (West). He earned his unusual nickname as a result of batters who "seemed drugged by his pitches and unable to concentrate or focus on the baseball." Following his Negro leagues career, he went on to play for many more years in the Mexican League. García died in Caraballeda, Venezuela in 1995 at age 89.

References

External links
 and Baseball-Reference Black Baseball stats and Seamheads
 Manuel 'Cocaína' García at Negro League Baseball Players Association

1905 births
1995 deaths
Cuban Stars (East) players
Cuban Stars (West) players
New York Cubans players
Baseball pitchers
People from Villa Clara Province
Cuban expatriate baseball players in the United States